Kenneth Leon King (born March 7, 1957) is an American former professional football player who was a running back for seven seasons in the National Football League (NFL), mainly with the Oakland/Los Angeles Raiders. He was a starter for the Raiders in Super Bowl XV and Super Bowl XVIII.

High school
Kenny King was one of the best running backs in Texas while at Clarendon High School. He was inducted into the Texas Panhandle Sports Hall of Fame in 2008. Kenny ran behind mean green Larry Shields, his fullback.

College career
After a stellar high school career, Kenny King played tailback and fullback at University of Oklahoma in the famed wishbone offense under Barry Switzer. King led the team in Rushing in 1976 with 791 yards on 141 carries for a 5.6 average; he also had 4 touchdowns. He shared the backfield with Heisman Trophy winner Billy Sims.

Professional career
After attending Oklahoma, King was drafted in the Third round (72nd overall) of the 1979 amateur draft by the Houston Oilers. After his first season in Houston, the Oilers traded King to the Oakland Raiders where he spent the rest of his career, and followed them to Los Angeles upon the team's move there in 1982. King set a Super Bowl record for the longest touchdown reception with an 80-yarder in the Raiders 27-10 Super Bowl XV victory over the Philadelphia Eagles. That record stood until it was surpassed by Green Bay Packer Antonio Freeman's 81-yard touchdown pass from Brett Favre in Super Bowl XXXI. He played one season for the CFL's Hamilton Tiger-Cats in 1987, playing in 2 games for them that season before retiring.

References

External links
 Professional statistics

1957 births
Living people
African-American players of American football
American football running backs
Oklahoma Sooners football players
Houston Oilers players
Oakland Raiders players
Los Angeles Raiders players
American Conference Pro Bowl players
People from Clarendon, Texas
Players of American football from Texas
21st-century African-American people
20th-century African-American sportspeople